Antileukemic drugs, anticancer drugs that are used to treat one or more types of leukemia, include:
6-Mercaptopurine
6-Thioguanine
Arsenic trioxide
Asparaginase
Cladribine
Clofarabine
Cyclophosphamide
Cytosine arabinoside
Dasatinib
Daunorubicin
Decitabine
Etoposide
Fludarabine
Gemtuzumab ozogamicin
Idarubicin
Imatinib mesylate
Interferon-α
Interleukin-2
Melphalan
Methotrexate
Mitoxantrone
Nelarabine
Nilotinib
Oblimersen
Pegaspargase
Pentostatin
Ponatinib
Prednisone
Rituximab
Tretinoin
Vincristine

Leukemia
Lists of drugs